Len Webster (26 December 1906 – 7 October 1985) was an Australian rules footballer who played with Essendon in the Victorian Football League (VFL).

Webster, a fireman by profession, was a ruckman for Blackwood Forest and Loch before joining Essendon.

He had an early setback in 1930 when he required surgery to remove cartilage in his knee but recovered well enough to play 15 of a possible 18 games in 1931.

Essendon appointed him vice-captain in 1935 and the following season he represented Victoria for a second time, having previously played for his state in 1929. He was captain of Essendon for the entire 1938 VFL season.

Despite making 145 appearances for Essendon, Webster never played in a single final.

References

1906 births
Australian rules footballers from Victoria (Australia)
Essendon Football Club players
Brunswick Football Club players
Brunswick Football Club coaches
1985 deaths